Sheila Sealy Monteith is a Jamaican career diplomat currently serving as Jamaica Ambassador Extraordinary and Plenipotentiary to Belgium and Jamaican Permanent Representative to the European Union and United Nations Education, Scientific and Cultural Organisation, UNESCO.

Career 
Monteith started her diplomatic career in the Ministry of Foreign Affairs rising through the ranks to the position of ambassador. She was first appointed Jamaican Ambassador to Mexico with accreditation to Central America and later served as High Commissioner to Belize from 2005 to 2010 and transferred to Canada as High Commissioner serving from 2010 to 2014. She was Under-Secretary for multilateral affairs in the Ministry of Foreign Affairs until 2017, when she was appointed ambassador to Belgium and Permanent Representative to the European Union and UNESCO and accredited as non-resident ambassador to France, Luxembourg, Monaco, The Netherlands, Portugal and Spain.

References 

Jamaican women diplomats
Jamaican women ambassadors
Permanent Representatives of Jamaica to the European Union
Permanent Representatives of Jamaica to the United Nations
Jamaican officials of the United Nations
Ambassadors of Jamaica to Belgium
Permanent Delegates of Jamaica to UNESCO